The 2016 UIM F1 H2O World Championship was the 33rd season of Formula 1 Powerboat racing. The season consisted of seven races, beginning in Dubai, UAE on 4 March 2016, and ending in Sharjah, UAE on 16 December 2016, although initial plans indicated a ten race calendar.

Philippe Chiappe, driving for the CTIC F1 Shenzhen China Team, entered the season as defending double world champion and successfully retained his title to become only the third driver in the sport's history to win three back-to-back drivers' championships. In addition, Chiappe's CTIC F1 Shenzhen China Team clinched their first teams' championship. Both the BRM Pole Position Trophy and Fast Lap Trophy were also won by Chiappe.

Teams and drivers

Team and driver changes
There was a considerable amount of continuity from 2015 into the 2016 season as far as team and driver line-ups were concerned. Following the upheaval the previous year, the driver pairings at CTIC China, Victory Team, Team Abu Dhabi, Mad-Croc and Team Sweden were all unchanged. At the F1 Atlantic Team, Youssef Al Rubayan had retired, and was replaced by former Team EMIC driver Christophe Larigot to partner regular driver Duarte Benavente. To replace Larigot, Team EMIC hired promising rookie Mike Szymura. The German was already a three-time F4-S champion and would drive a Jonathan Jones-built Dragon boat from the second round onwards. Francesco Cantando's team retained himself and Bartek Marszalek as drivers, but lost their Motorglass sponsorship, thus reverting their name to Blaze Performance Team in deference to Cantando's self-built Blaze boats. Bernd Enzenhofer did not return for the team. At Emirates Racing, Ivan Brigada stood in for Ahmed Al Hameli at the opening round in Dubai, though Al Hameli returned for France, partnering Erik Stark for the rest of the year. Brigada meanwhile made a further appearance, this time for Team EMIC at Évian-les-Bains in a third boat. Cédric Deguisne's Maverick Racing team participated in the European rounds of the championship for a second year, while there were additional entries at the final two rounds. Grant Trask brought the Trask name back to Formula 1 powerboats when he drove a third boat for Team EMIC at both Abu Dhabi and Sharjah, while Rashed Al Qamzi, cousin to Thani Al Qamzi, was rewarded for winning the F4-S title with a one-off drive in Sharjah in a third boat for Team Abu Dhabi. Away from driver changes, another legend of the sport made a return to team activities as Renato Molinari joined the Emirates Team as Team Principal alongside Scott Gillman.

The popularity of the Moore hulls which were being campaigned so successfully by Philippe Chiappe was in evidence in 2016 as the manufacturer made a surprise switch from CTIC China to officially support Victory Team midway through the year. Victory had attempted to compete with their own hull, based closely on the Moore design, but with results not forthcoming, were able to convince the French boat builder to switch sides. The decision paid off, with Shaun Torrente taking Victory's first F1 win at the final race of the year in a Moore hull. Thus Chiappe's 2016 title win was the first since Jay Price's championship in 2009 where the team was not the primary supported outfit of the hull manufacturer - DAC in the case of Price who were officially supporting Guido Cappellini.

Season calendar

A ten-race preliminary calendar for the 2016 championship was revealed in a press release on the sport's official website in January. Amongst regular fixtures Abu Dhabi and Sharjah were two new races, with the championship scheduled to make its first appearances in Dubai and Croatia. Races in France and Portugal returned after their re-introduction in 2015, although the Portuguese race switched venues from Porto back to its traditional location Portimão. China returned to having two races on the calendar, an arrangement last seen in 2010 when three races from the country featured. An additional two rounds, expected to be in Asia, were left vacant by the announcement to be confirmed at a later date. Speculation linked one of these vacant slots to a proposed race in Phuket, Thailand, which had provisionally held a slot on the 2015 calendar before the round was cancelled midway through the year. A race in Macau was also under negotiation to fill the other calendar slot. Ultimately however, neither the Thai nor Macau race materialised, while the Croatian event was also cancelled, leaving the calendar at seven confirmed races for the year.

Results and standings
Points were awarded to the top 10 classified finishers. A maximum of two boats per team were eligible for points in the teams' championship.

Drivers standings

Teams standings
Only boats with results eligible for points counting towards the teams' championship are shown here.

References

External links
 
 The official website of the Union Internationale Motonautique

F1 Powerboat World Championship
Formula 1 Powerboat seasons
F1 Powerboat World Championship